Ariyalur railway station (Code: ALU) is the main railway station in Ariyalur, headquarters of the Ariyalur district in Tamil Nadu, India. It is located on the chord line between Viluppuram and Tiruchirappalli. For administrative reasons, it comes under the Tiruchirappalli railway division of the Southern Railway zone.

Location and layout
The railway station is situated on the Perambalur main Road on the western part of the city. It is the main railhead for both Ariyalur,  Thanajvur and Perambalur districts since railway stations in other towns of Ariyalur district such as Lalgudi and Sendurai barely have any express trains halting and Permbalur district does not have a railway station at all, ever since the bifurcation of the Ariyalur district. It hence serves as an important railway hub for passengers from the central districts of Tamil Nadu. Certain TNSTC busses are operated from Thanjavur to Ariyalur Railway station for passengers' convenience.

The station falls on the Viluppuram–Tiruchirappalli chord line, which is the only line passing through the station. The railway line towards the south has been completed doubling work, spanning across two sections namely the Ariyalur-Kallakudi Palanganatham stretch and then the Valadi-Kallakudi Palanganatham stretch, after which it is single line till Tiruchirappalli. The same double line infrastructure completed extends up to R.S. Mathur towards the north beyond which it is single line again till .

Amenities
The station has been declared as one of the Adarsh railway stations in Tamil Nadu. Hence it has amenities such as upper-class waiting rooms, ATMs, ramps and wheel chairs for the differently-abled, retiring rooms etc. There is a TNSTC bus station which provides local bus services from the station.

The station however is suffering from serious infrastructural problems according to passengers. The withdrawal of many of the direct bus services from the station to Thanjavur, as well as absence of sufficient services on other routes is viewed as a great hardship on the part of commuters to the station. This is compounded by lack of regular bus services from Ariyalur railway station to the Ariyalur main bus stand and high auto rickshaw fares for commuting that distance. Lack of porters and petty shops, inadequate number of seats and shelters and unavailability of additional platforms form the other issues at the station. Project on doubling the track between Ariyalur and Valadi segment to a length of 50 km had been executed, the 25-km stretch between Ariyalur and Mathur also commissioned. As part of doubling of the track, the Ariyalur station has been beautified and expanded, according to Rail Vikas Nigam Limited (RVNL).
Additional platform created was 550 metres. The additional platform would ensure smooth operation of trains.

References

Railway stations in Ariyalur district
Trichy railway division